Liefdesstrijd  is a 1915 Dutch silent drama film directed by Maurits Binger.

Cast
Annie Bos	 ... 	Kate van Marlen
Willem van der Veer	... 	Alfred van der Loo
Florent La Roche Jr.	... 	Ruprecht van Halden
Paula de Waart	... 	Kate's mother
Martha Walden	... 	Alice
Jan van Dommelen	... 	Tenant out for revenge
Christine van Meeteren	
Louis H. Chrispijn		
Louis Bouwmeester	... 	Achthoven
Fred Homann

External links 
 

1915 films
Dutch silent feature films
Dutch black-and-white films
1915 drama films
Films directed by Maurits Binger
Dutch drama films
Silent drama films